Wesleyan (12 Altosolos) 1992 is a live solo album by composer Anthony Braxton featuring a performance recorded at Wesleyan University which was released on the hatART label.

Reception

The Allmusic review by Brian Olewnick stated "Wesleyan (12 Altosolos) 1992 fits quite comfortably into the extraordinary series of recordings of this artist which continued to unearth entirely new and wonderfully creative "language music" for the alto saxophone".

Track listing
All compositions by Anthony Braxton except where noted
 "No. 170i" – 4:50
 "No. 106d (+170b)" – 6:06
 "No. 170a" – 3:23
 "Charlie's Wig" (Charlie Parker) – 6:54
 "No. 170c (+77d+99f)" – 6:04
 "No. 170f (+138c+106g+119d+99d+119f)" – 8:28
 "I'm Getting Sentimental Over You" (George Bassman, Ned Washington) – 4:59
 "No. 170g" – 6:59
 "No. 106j (+106m)" – 4:08
 "No. 170h" – 5:28
 "Just Friends" (John Klenner, Sam M. Lewis) – 6:57
 "No. 118f" – 7:26

Personnel
 Anthony Braxton – alto saxophone

References

Anthony Braxton live albums
1993 live albums
Hathut Records live albums